The 1993 Albany Firebirds season was the fourth season for the Firebirds. They finished 5–7 and lost in the 1st round of the AFL playoffs to the Tampa Bay Storm.

Regular season

Schedule

Standings

z – clinched homefield advantage

y – clinched division title

x – clinched playoff spot

Playoffs

External links
1993 Albany Firebirds on ArenaFan.com

Albany Firebirds
Albany Firebirds
Indiana Firebirds seasons